Francisco Portillo may refer to:

 Francisco Portillo (footballer, born 1981), Panamanian goalkeeper
 Francisco Portillo (footballer, born 1984), Paraguayan midfielder
 Francisco Portillo (footballer, born 1990), Spanish midfielder

See also
Portillo (surname)